Basilios Blatsos (1923 – October 3, 2012) was the Greek Orthodox bishop of Caesarea, Israel.

Notes

Eastern Orthodox Christians from Israel
Bishops of the Greek Orthodox Church of Jerusalem
1923 births
2012 deaths